Hypolycaena alcestis is a butterfly in the family Lycaenidae. It was described by Henley Grose-Smith in 1889. It is found on Guadalcanal and Tulagi.

References

Butterflies described in 1889
Hypolycaenini
Butterflies of Oceania
Taxa named by Henley Grose-Smith